Miss World 1987, the 37th edition of the Miss World pageant, was held on 12 November 1987 at the Royal Albert Hall in London, UK. The winner was Ulla Weigerstorfer (Queen of Europe) from Austria. She was crowned by Miss World 1986, Giselle Jeanne-Marie Laronde of Trinidad & Tobago. Runner-up was Albani Josefina Lozada Jiménez (Queen of Americas) from Venezuela, and third was Anna Margrét Jónsdóttir from Iceland.

Results

Placements

Continental Queens of Beauty

Contestants
78 countries participated in Miss World 1987.

Judges

 Eric Morley † – Chairperson of Miss World
 Linford Christie
 Robert Coleman
 John Coleman
 Pilin Leon – Miss World 1981 from Venezuela
 Hayley Mills
 Albert Vinci
 Rick Wakeman
 Simon Williams

Notes

Debuts

Returns
Last competed in 1981:
  returned after a 6-year war in the Malvinas Islands which brought its dispute against the United Kingdom.
 
Last competed in 1985:

Withdrawals
  – because of the national pageant postponement
  – because of the national pageant postponement

References

External links
 Pageantopolis – Miss World 1987

Miss World
1987 in London
1987 beauty pageants
Beauty pageants in the United Kingdom
Events at the Royal Albert Hall
November 1987 events in the United Kingdom